Gur Sefid or Gur-e Sefid may refer to:
Gur-e Sefid, Fars
Gur Sefid, Kermanshah
Gur Sefid, Lorestan
Gur Sefid, Tehran